La Historia is the first compilation album of the Puerto Rican singer and composer Ricky Martin. It was released on February 27, 2001, by Sony Discos and Columbia Records. The recordings are in Spanish. The album contains reworkings of two of Martin's early songs: "Fuego Contra Fuego" and "El Amor de Mi Vida".
The compilation was released in two different formats. The CD edition contains sixteen of his best songs, in the American and Japanese version, the song "Sólo Quiero Amarte" is included (the Spanish version of "Nobody Wants to Be Lonely"). The DVD edition contains thirteen music videos of Martin.

Commercial performance
La Historia wasn't promoted by any single, did not include any new recordings, and contains only Spanish-language songs.

In the United States, La Historia peaked at number one for five weeks on the [[Billboard Top Latin Albums|''Billboards Top Latin Albums]] and number eighty-three on the Billboard 200. It was certified 4× Platinum Latin award for shipping 400,000 units in the US, and has sold 220,000 copies, according to Nielsen SoundScan (as of January 2011).

The album also topped the chart in Argentina and Sweden, and was certified Platinum in both countries. Other achievements include peaks at number thirteen in Spain, number sixteen in Italy, number twenty-three in Switzerland, and number thirty-seven in Japan. La Historia was also certified Gold in Spain.

Accolades
La Historia was nominated as the Latin Greatest Hits Album of the Year at the 2002 Latin Billboard Music Awards but lost to Vicente Fernández's Historia de un Ídolo, Vol. 1.

Track listing

Charts

Weekly charts

Year-end charts

Certifications and salesAlbumDVD'''

Release history

References

Ricky Martin compilation albums
Ricky Martin video albums
Spanish-language albums
2001 greatest hits albums
2001 video albums
Music video compilation albums
Sony Discos compilation albums
Sony Discos video albums